Rhymes in Rooms is the second live album by Al Stewart, released in 1992. It is an acoustic concert featuring Stewart and his longtime collaborator Peter White in a number of sets recorded live in locations in the US and Japan.

Track listing
"Flying Sorcery" – 4:32
"Soho (Needless to Say)" – 3:53
"Time Passages" – 5:40
"Josephine Baker" – 4:04
"On the Border" – 5:05
"Nostradamus" – 10:14
"Fields of France" – 4:08
"Clifton in the Rain/Small Fruit Song" – 4:57
"Broadway Hotel" – 4:22
"Leave It" – 5:25
"Year of the Cat" – 6:36

"Leave It" is the song "If It Doesn't Come Naturally, Leave It".

Musicians
Al Stewart – vocal, guitar
Peter White – guitar, accordion, piano

References

Al Stewart albums
1992 live albums